Satyendranath Dutta (also spelt Satyendranath Datta or Satyendra Nath Dutta) (1882 – 25 June 1922), a Bengali poet, is considered the "wizard of rhymes" (or 'ছন্দের জাদুকর'; chhonder jadukar in Bengali). Satyendranath Dutta was an expert in many disciplines of intellectual enquiry including medieval Indian history, culture, and mythology.

Early life and education
Satyendranath Dutta was the son of Rajaninath Dutta, who was a trader. He was born on 11 February 1882 at Nimta, Bengal Presidency, British India. The family hailed from Chupi in Purba Bardhaman district He was the only son of his parents.  His grandfather, Akshay Kumar Datta, was a great thinker,  Brahmo social reformer and writer who was the guiding spirit of the Tattwabodhini Patrika. After passing the school-leaving examination from the Central Collegiate School, he received his graduate-level education from the General Assembly's Institution in Kolkata. Although he left (what is now) Scottish Church College without taking a degree, his training there helped him immensely for the future. After unsuccessfully joining the ranks of his father in their family business, he quit that to devote his energies entirely to scholarly pursuits. He wrote poems like Jatir Pati.

Personal life
In 1903, Satyendranath Dutta married Kanaklata Devi, eldest daughter of Ishan Chandra Bose and Giribala Devi  (her biological mother Noroda Sundari Devi, the first wife of Ishan Chandra Bose, died when Kanaklata and her siblings were young children).  Kanaklata Devi was from a wealthy Hindu Kulin Kayastha family, originally hailing from Dhaka Nayabari and later settled at Howrah where the family owned estates. The marriage was fixed by their families, which was a common practice at that time. After Satyendranath Dutta's death in 1922, Kanaklata Devi lived a lonely life and died in December 1967.

Death
He died on 25 June 1922, aged 40.  Rabindranath Tagore has immortalized Satyendranath in a poem written after his death.  Kazi Nazrul Islam also wrote a poem titled 'Sayendranath' eulogizing his death. A street in South Kolkata has been named after him.

Works
Satyendranath Dutta composed poems and initially composed poems for the Bengali magazine Bharati. Although his stylistic nuances during this stage reflect the influence of Michael Madhusudan Dutt, Akshay Kumar Baral and Debendranath Sen, his later poetry illustrates a greater resonance with the poetry of Rabindranath Tagore.

Dutta wrote under multiple pseudonyms, including Nabakumar, Kaviratna, Ashitipar Sharma, Tribikram Varman and Kalamgir.

Books of poems
 Sabita (The Sun, 1900)
 Sandhiksan (The Opportune Moment, 1905)
 Benu O Bina (The Blaze of the Yagya, 1907)
 Fuler Fasal (The Harvest of Flowers, 1911)
 Kuhu O Keka (Song of Cuckoo and Peahen, 1912)
 Tulir Likhon (Written with a Brush, 1914)
 Abhra-Avir (Farewell Hymn, 1924)
 Kavyasanchayan (Collected Poems, 1930)
 Shishu-Kavita (Children's Poetry, 1945)
 Bhorai (The song of Dawn)
 Tirtha-renu
 Tirtha-Salil

Other works
 Janmaduhkhi (Destined to be sad from Birth - novel, 1912)
 Chiner Dhup (Chinese incense - essays, 1912) 
 Rangamalli (play, 1913)

References

Sansad Bangali Charitabhidhan (Biographical dictionary) in Bengali edited by Subodh Chandra Sengupta and Anjali Bose

External links

Satyendranath Dutta at the West Bengal Public Library Network

Writers from Kolkata
1882 births
1922 deaths
19th-century Bengali poets
20th-century Bengali poets
19th-century Bengalis
20th-century Bengalis
Bengali poets
Bengali Hindus
Bengali-language poets
Bengali writers
Bengali-language writers
Bengali male poets
Dutta, Satyendranath
Dutta, Satyendranath
Dutta, Satyendranath
Translators to Bengali
Indian translators
Indian poets
Indian male writers
Indian male poets
Poets from West Bengal
People from West Bengal
19th-century Indian male writers
20th-century Indian male writers
19th-century Indian translators
20th-century Indian translators
20th-century Indian writers
19th-century Indian writers
20th-century Indian poets
19th-century Indian poets